The city of Wrocław is divided into administrative districts called osiedle.

Divisions of Wrocław 
The current division was introduced in 1990 and revised by the City Council in 2016.
 Bieńkowice
 Biskupin-Sępolno-Dąbie-Bartoszowice
 Borek
 Brochów
 Gaj
 Gajowice
 Gądów-Popowice Płd.
 Grabiszyn-Grabiszynek
 Huby
 Jagodno
 Jerzmanowo-Jarnołtów-Strachowice-Osiniec
 Karłowice-Różanka
 Klecina
 Kleczków
 Kowale
 Krzyki-Partynice
 Księże
 Kuźniki
 Leśnica
 Lipa Piotrowska
 Maślice
 Muchobór Mały
 Muchobór Wielki
 Nadodrze
 Nowy Dwór
 Ołbin
 Ołtaszyn
 Oporów
 Osobowice-Rędzin
 Pawłowice
 Pilczyce-Kozanów-Popowice Płn.
 Plac Grunwaldzki
 Polanowice-Poświętne-Ligota
 Powstańców Śląskich
 Pracze Odrzańskie
 Przedmieście Oławskie
 Przedmieście Świdnickie
 Psie Pole-Zawidawie
 Sołtysowice
 Stare Miasto
 Strachocin-Swojczyce-Wojnów
 Szczepin
 Świniary
 Tarnogaj
 Widawa
 Wojszyce
 Zacisze-Zalesie-Szczytniki
 Żerniki

Locations

Districts in 1952-1990

Stare Miasto 
 Stare Miasto
 Przedmieście Świdnickie (1808)
 Szczepin (1808)

Śródmieście 

 Bartoszowice (1928)
 Biskupin (1928)
 Dąbie (1928)
 Nadodrze (1991)
 Ołbin (1808)
 Plac Grunwaldzki (1991)
 Sępolno (1924)
 Zacisze (1928)
 Zalesie (1904)
 Szczytniki (1808 Stare Szczytniki; 1868 Nowe Szczytniki)

Krzyki 

 Bieńkowice (1951)
 Bierdzany (1928)
 Borek (1897)
 Brochów (1951)
 Dworek (1868)
 Gaj (1904)
 Glinianki (1868)
 Huby (1868)
 Jagodno (1951)
 Klecina (1951)
 Krzyki (1928)
 Księże Małe i Wielkie (1928)
 Lamowice Stare (1951)
 Nowy Dom (1928)
 Ołtaszyn (1951)
 Opatowice (1928)
 Partynice (1928)
 Południe (1868)
 Przedmieście Oławskie (1808)
 Rakowiec (1904)
 Siedlec (1928)
 Świątniki (1928)
 Tarnogaj (1904)
 Wilczy Kąt (1808)
 Wojszyce (1951)

Psie Pole 

 Karłowice (1928)
 Kleczków (1808)
 Kłokoczyce (1973)
 Kowale (1928)
 Lesica (1973)
 Ligota (1928)
 Lipa Piotrowska (1973)
 Miłostków/Marzanów (1951)
 Mirowiec (1928)
 Osobowice (1928)
 Pawłowice (1970)
 Polanka (1808)
 Polanowice (1973)
 Poświętne (1928)
 Pracze Widawskie (1973)
 Psie Pole (1928)
 Rędzin (1973)
 Różanka (1928)
 Sołtysowice (1951)
 Strachocin (1928)
 Swojczyce (1928)
 Świniary (1973)
 Widawa (1973)
 Wojnów (1951)
 Zakrzów (1951)
 Zgorzelisko (1951)

Fabryczna 

 Gajowice (1868)
 Gądów Mały (1928)
 Grabiszyn (1911)
 Grabiszynek (1911)
 Janówek (1973)
 Jarnołtów (1973)
 Jerzmanowo (1973)
 Kozanów (1928)
 Kuźniki (1928)
 Leśnica (1928)
 Marszowice (1973)
 Maślice (1928)
 Mokra (1973)
 Muchobór Mały (1928)
 Muchobór Wielki (1951)
 Nowa Karczma (1928)
 Nowe Domy (1928)
 Nowy Dwór (1928)
 Oporów (1951)
 Pilczyce (1928)
 Popowice (1897)
 Pracze Odrzańskie (1928)
 Pustki (1928)
 Ratyń (1928)
 Stabłowice (1928)
 Stabłowice Nowe (1928)
 Strachowice and Osiniec (1973)
 Złotniki (1928)
 Żar (1973)
 Żerniki (1928)

Districts before 1945

Stare Miasto (Altstadt) 
 Schloßviertel (Dzielnica Zamkowa)
 Taschenviertel (Dzielnica Sakwowa)
 Neumarktviertel (Dzielnica Nowego Targu)
 Elisabethviertel (Dzielnica św. Elżbiety)

Przedmieście Odrzańskie (Oder-Stadtteil) 
 Matthiasviertel (Dzielnica św. Macieja)
 Bürgerwerder (Kępa Mieszczańska)
 Schießwerderviertel (Kępa Strzelecka)
 Elbing (Ołbin)
 Kletschkau (Kleczków)
 Polinke (Polanka)

Przedmieście Piaskowe (Sand-Stadtteil) 
 Domviertel (Dzielnica Katedralna; Ostrów Tumski)
 Hochschulviertel (Dzielnica Akademicka); Neu-Scheitnig (Nowe Szczytniki)
 Sternviertel (Dzielnica Gwieździsta)
 Michaelisviertel (Dzielnica św. Michała)
 Scheitnig (Szczytniki)
 Leerbeutel (Zalesie)

Przedmieście Oławskie (Ohlauer Stadteil) 
 Mauritiusviertel (Dzielnica św. Maurycego)
 Ohleviertel (Dzielnica Oławska)
 Morgenau (Rakowiec)
 Parschner Viertel (Parczów)

Przedmieście Strzelińskie (Strehlener Stadteil) 
 Teichäckern (Pola Stawowe)
 Lehmgruben (Glinianki)
 Herdain (Gaj)
 Huben (Huby)
 Dürrgoy (Tarnogaj)

Przedmieście Świdnickie (Schweidnitzer Stadtteil) 
 Tauentzienviertel (Dzielnica Tauentziena)
 Siebenhufen (Siedem Łanów)
 Gabitz (Gajowice)
 Neudorf (Nowa Wieś)
 Kleinburg (Borek)
 Kaiser-Wilhelm-Viertel (Dzielnica Cesarza Wilhelma)

Przedmieście Mikołajskie (Nikolai-Stadteil) 
 Friedrich-Wilhelm-Viertel (Dzielnica Fryderyka Wilhelma)
 Märkisches Viertel (Dzielnica Markijska)
 Tschepine (Szczepin)
 Pöpelwitz (Popowice)
 Zankholz (Sporny Las)

See also

 Wrocław Old Town

References